"Ram Pam Pam" is a song by Dominican singer Natti Natasha and American singer Becky G. The song and its music video were released by Pina Records and Sony Music Latin on April 20, 2021. It was written by the two singers, Francisco Saldaña, Ovimael Maldonado Burgos, Nino Karlo Segarra, Justin Quiles, Siggy Vázquez, Elena Rose, Juan Manuel Frias, Valentina López and its producers Jean Carlos Hernández Espinal and Rafael Pina. It interpolates 'Ella Me Levantó", written and performed by Daddy Yankee. It is Natasha and Gomez's third collaboration, following "Sin Pijama" and the remix of "Dura", both released in April 2018.

Background and release 
On April 20, 2018, Gomez released "Sin Pijama" with Natasha, a collaboration that would go on to become a big hit, being certified platinum by the RIAA's Latin field and accumulating 100 million views within three weeks. Gomez and Natasha became close friends while filming its music video, and they were featured on the remix of "Dura" by Daddy Yankee.

Natasha released her single "Las Nenas" with Cazzu and Farina featuring La Duraca in March 2021. The end of its music video featured a cameo from Gomez in a car, picking up Natasha and then driving off, leading to speculation that the next single would feature her. Both artists teased the song bout a week before its release, uploading into each of their social medias a video saying, "The story continues" and "The perfect combo". They later revealed the cover art and its release date, which was on the third anniversary of their first song together.

Music and lyrics 
"Ram Pam Pam" is a reggaeton song lasting three minutes and twenty-one seconds. Its structure is similar to that of "Sin Pijama", with Gomez taking the first verse and Natasha the second. The pre-chorus at the beginning of the song is done by both. The first chorus is sung solely by Natasha, with Gomez taking the latter half on the rest. Natasha sings the post-chorus after the second chorus and Gomez does the second one after the third.

Lyrically, the song is about the girls telling their ex's that they're over them and found someone better. Gomez's verse is about her ex having "lots of chains" that at the end didn't serve for anything, that he didn't see he "had a queen in front of [him]" and that she's better off without him. Natasha raps about kicking her ex out, not wanting him anymore and having "another that fits better". Her verse includes an interpolation of the line "Llora, nena, llora, llora" (Cry, baby, cry, cry) from "Ella Me Levantó" by Yankee, but with reversed genders, telling him to cry for her. The chorus has the singers saying that they "ha[ve] new boyfriend[s] that do ram pam pam" to them, an euphemism for sex.

Music video

Background 
The music video for "Ram Pam Pam" was directed by Venezuelan director Daniel Duran, Gomez's constant collaborator and was filmed using a green screen. It was released alongside the song on April 20. Similar to "Sin Pijama", the video includes a cameo appearance by American singer Prince Royce.

Synopsis 
The video shows Natasha and Gomez arriving at a basketball court, where they go into the locker room to change. The girls sing in the locker room, the bleachers and on the court, being accompanied by backup dancers in the latter. They peek through a door to see Royce and his team playing. Despite no game being shown, the girls appear holding a trophy at the end, celebrating with champagne. In its closing scene, Natasha throws the basketball at Royce, possibly referencing their collaboration "Antes Que Salga El Sol".

Live performances
Natasha and Gomez performed "Ram Pam Pam" together for the first time at The Tonight Show Starring Jimmy Fallon on May 17, 2021.

Remix
On September 7, 2021, a German-Spanish version of the song with German singer Vanessa Mai was released.

Accolades

Charts

Weekly charts

Year-end charts

Certifications

Release history

See also
List of Billboard number-one Latin songs of 2021

Notes

References

2021 singles
2021 songs
Natti Natasha songs
Becky G songs
Songs written by Daddy Yankee
Sony Music Latin singles
Spanish-language songs
Songs written by Rafael Pina
Songs written by Becky G
Songs written by Justin Quiles
Songs written by Elena Rose
Songs written by Francisco Saldaña